Piozzano is a comune (municipality) in the Province of Piacenza in the Italian region Emilia-Romagna, located about  northwest of Bologna and about  southwest of Piacenza.   

Piozzano borders the following municipalities: Agazzano, ]Alta Val Tidone, Bobbio, Gazzola, Pianello Val Tidone, Travo.

References

External links
 Official website

Cities and towns in Emilia-Romagna